De Waarheid (literally 'The Truth') was the newspaper of the Communist Party of the Netherlands. It originated in 1940 under the German occupation as a resistance paper, the day after general H.G. Winkelman had forbidden publication of the earlier Communist Volksdagblad. The party decided on May 15, 1940, to continue the Volksdagblad illegally under the name De Waarheid. The first months were spent setting up a nationwide network of 'handout points' ('stencilposten'), the main articles would be written centrally, whereas the different 'handout points' added localized articles. These local versions sometimes were published under different names as 'De vonk' ('The spark') and 'Het noorderlicht' ('The northern light').  In the last decades it became a more independent left wing newspaper but circulation continued to drop and the paper was discontinued on 28 April 1990.

Circulation figures 
1945 (September): 341.550
1947: 150.000
1948: 135.000
1950: 113.000
1955: 50.000
1960: 29.000
1966: 22.000
1968: 21.200
1970: 20.000
1975: 22.000
1980: 26.000
1985: 12.000
1988: 9.000

Editors

References

External links 
 De Waarheid from 20 September 1943 from Historische Kranten website. Retrieved 14 April 2008.

1940 establishments in the Netherlands
1990 disestablishments in the Netherlands
Communist newspapers
Defunct newspapers published in the Netherlands
Dutch-language newspapers
Dutch resistance newspapers
Newspapers established in 1940
Publications disestablished in 1990